Shahrak-e Shahid Beheshti (also Romanized as Shahrak-e Shahīd Beheshtī; also known as Shahrak-e Shahīd Beheshtī-ye Khowrāb) is a village in Bampur-e Sharqi Rural District, in the Central District of Bampur County, Sistan and Baluchestan Province, Iran. At the 2006 census, its population was 1,136, in 223 families.

References 

Populated places in Bampur County